Akbarabad (also Romanized as Akbarābād) is a village in Khormarud-e Shomali Rural District, in the Central District of Azadshahr County, Golestan Province, Iran. At the 2006 census, its population was 1,039, in 240 families.

References 

Populated places in Azadshahr County